St. Joseph's Academy (SJA) was founded on January 29, 1964 by Monsignor Jose Alojipan. Its first principal was Marie Consejo, ICM.

History
1964 January 29-Foundation with Msgr. Jose Alojipan (Director)
1966 July - handed over to the ICM. 1st community lived in one classroom.
1968 - 1st high school graduation.
1971 - Re-orientation of ICM services.
1973 - Social Orientation with Sr. Nellie Tabada, ICM.
1974 - ICM statement of 1974 General Assembly which is 'The Creation Of new Society Truly Human and Fraternal, Just and Free".
1986 - EDSA event space and home for democratic processes.
1992 - ICM General Mandate held in Rome came out with the mandate 'A Renewed Call To Mission".
1998 - ICM General Chapter: Call to Mission-Radical Discipleship of Jesus.
2001 - EDSA 2.
2002 - Big Fire that started at the Mandaue Market had blazed down SJA. Last year of ICM missionaries.
2003 - Last Year of ICM management.
2004 - Archdiocesan management took over with the Archdiocesian Superintendent of Catholic Schools, Rev. Fr. Eduardo O. Ventic as School Director. High School Department became Co-ed. SJA was proclaimed top performing school of Mandaue. Kindergarten classes were open.
2005 - SJA was awarded outstanding academic institution by the Mandaue City Government and Mandaue Chamber of Commerce and Industry, Inc.
2007 - Blessing and Inaugurations of new SJA five storey building.
2008 - SJA opened Grade one class in Carmen Cebu.
2016 - SJA started the Giuseppean Covered Court Construction
2017 - SJA officially opened the Giuseppean Covered Court
2017 - SJA opened Intramurals 2017
We will put more updates about this school sooner. Thanks for reading. -«iSH Geσxσr» [Head Admin, Updater]

Assistant School director (SY: 2013-2014) is Rev. Fr. Joel P. Oriesga
School director (SY: 2017-2018) is Dr. Maria Alma T. Flores

References

External links

Schools in Mandaue
Educational institutions established in 1964
1964 establishments in the Philippines